Ludwig Devrient (15 December 178430 December 1832) was a German actor, noted for his playing in the works of Shakespeare and Schiller.

Devrient, who was born in Berlin, left a commercial career for the stage in 1804. He joined a travelling theatrical company, and made his first appearance on the stage at Gera as the messenger in Schiller's Braut von Messina. By the interest of Count Brühl, he appeared at Rudolstadt as Franz Moor in Schiller's Die Räuber, so successfully that he obtained a permanent engagement at the ducal theatre in Dessau, where he played until 1809. He then received a call to Breslau, where he remained for six years. Such was his success in the title-parts of several of Shakespeare's plays, that the leading actor August Wilhelm Iffland began to fear for his own reputation; yet that artist was generous enough to recommend the young actor as his only possible successor. On Iffland's death, Devrient was summoned to Berlin, where he was for fifteen years the popular idol. He died there in December 1832.

Ludwig Devrient was equally adept in comedy and tragedy. Falstaff, Franz Moor (in Die Räuber), Shylock, King Lear and Richard II were among his best parts. Karl von Holtei in his Reminiscences gave a graphic picture of him and the "demoniac fascination" of his acting. He also wrote several plays and a history of the German stage (1848–74) in five volumes. With his son, Otto, he published translations of Shakespeare's plays.

Devrient was a member of a notable theatrical family, his three nephews all being actors. Karl August Devrient (1797–1872) was popular in heroic and character roles such as Lear, Shylock, and Faust. Another nephew, Eduard Devrient (1801–1877), directed the Court Theatre, Dresden (1844–46), and the Karlsruhe Theatre (1852–70). Gustav Emil Devrient (1803–1872), was the youngest and most gifted of all three nephews of Ludwig Devrient.

Notes

References
 Endnotes:
 Z. Funck, Aus dem Leben zweier Schauspieler, Ifflands und Devrients (Leipzig, 1838)
 H. Smidt in Devrient-Novellen (3rd ed., Berlin, 1882)
 R. Springer in the novel Devrient und Hoffmann (Berlin, 1873)
 Eduard Devrient's Geschichte der deutschen Schauspielkunst (Leipzig, 1861)

Further reading

1784 births
1832 deaths
German male stage actors
Male actors from Berlin
18th-century German male actors
People from the Margraviate of Brandenburg
Iffland-Ring
People from the Kingdom of Prussia